The King Alfonso XIII's Cup 1927 was the 27th staging of the Copa del Rey, the Spanish football cup competition.

Teams
Champions and runners-up of each regional championship were able to participate in the tournament. 26 teams entered the competition, making a new record of participants.

Aragon: Iberia SC, Zaragoza CD
Asturias: Sporting de Gijón, Club Fortuna
Cantabria: Racing de Santander, Gimnástica de Torrelavega
Castile and León: Real Unión Deportiva, CD Español
Catalonia: FC Barcelona, CD Europa
Extremadura: CD Extremeño, Patria FC
Galicia: Celta de Vigo, Deportivo de La Coruña
Gipuzkoa: Real Unión, Real Sociedad
Murcia: Real Murcia, Cartagena FC
 Centre Region: Real Madrid, Athletic Madrid
 South Region: Sevilla FC, Real Betis
Valencia: Valencia CF, CD Castellón
Biscay: Athletic Bilbao, Arenas Club de Getxo

Group stage

Group 1

Group 2

Tie-break league:

Group 3

Group 4

Group 5

Group 6

Group 7

Group 8

Knockout phase

Quarterfinals
First leg:

Semifinals
May 8, 1927

Final

Notes

References
Linguasport.com
RSSSF.com

Copa del Rey seasons
Copa Del Rey, 1927
Copa